Helogale is a genus of the mongoose family (Herpestidae). It consists of two species and 12 subspecies:

Extant Species

The helogales are the smallest species of mongooses and both are endemic to Africa. The distribution of the Ethiopian dwarf mongoose is more tropical, and overlaps completely with that of the common dwarf mongoose, which is more widespread. Both are social diurnal species, and due to their small sizes they are vulnerable to predation. Both species live independently of open water.

References

 The Kingdon Field Guide to African Mammals, 1997, Jonathan Kingdon. 
 Anne Rasa: Mongoose Watch: A Family Observed, 1985, John Murray. 

 
Mongooses
 
Taxa named by John Edward Gray